Unibe may refer to:

University of Bern, Switzerland
Universidad Iberoamericana, Mexico
Universidad Iberoamericana (UNIBE), Dominican Republic
Universidad de Iberoamérica (UNIBE), Costa Rica